Nansang or Namsang Townshipis a township of Loilen District in the Shan State of Myanmar. The principal town is Nansang.

See ALso 
 Namsang

References 

 
Townships of Shan State
Loilen District